The Gould Jones Reservoir is a historic water storage tank, located on the grounds of the Newton County library, which was then just outside of Jasper, Arkansas on Arkansas Highway 7.  The tank is a circular masonry structure, built out of concrete and brick in 1942 by Gould Jones, a local blacksmith and mason.  It was built to provide water to a local tomato canning factory, and to provide water to the community of Jasper.

The tank was listed on the National Register of Historic Places in 1998.

See also
Jasper Commercial Historic District
National Register of Historic Places listings in Newton County, Arkansas

References

Water supply infrastructure on the National Register of Historic Places
Industrial buildings and structures on the National Register of Historic Places in Arkansas
Infrastructure completed in 1942
1942 establishments in Arkansas
National Register of Historic Places in Newton County, Arkansas